Makkoshotyka is a village in Borsod-Abaúj-Zemplén County, Hungary.

References

Populated places in Borsod-Abaúj-Zemplén County